Andrew Brown was an Irish soldier, journalist and congressional reporter. He was born in the north of Ireland about 1744, and was educated at Trinity College, Dublin, after which he joined the British army as an officer, serving in North America. According to

References

1740s births
18th-century Irish people
Irish journalists
American male journalists
Alumni of Trinity College Dublin
Kingdom of Ireland emigrants to the Thirteen Colonies
Year of death missing